Anctinopus anselmoi is a species of mygalomorph spider in the family Actinopodidae. It can be found in Brazil.

The specific name anselmoi refers to musician Phil Anselmo, vocalist for heavy metal band Pantera.

References 

anselmoi